The women's 100 metre freestyle was a swimming event held as part of the swimming at the 1928 Summer Olympics programme. It was the fourth appearance of the event, which was established in 1912. The competition was held on Friday and Saturday, 10 and 11 August 1928.

Twenty-four swimmers from eleven nations competed.

Records
These were the standing world and Olympic records (in seconds) prior to the 1928 Summer Olympics.

In the first semi-final Albina Osipowich equaled the Olympic record with 1 minute 12.2 seconds. In the second semi-final Eleanor Garatti improved the record with a time of 1 minute 11.4 seconds. In the final Albina Osipowich again bettered the Olympic record with 1 minute 11.0 seconds.

Results

Heats

The fastest two in each heat and the fastest third-placed from across the heats advanced.

Heat 1

Heat 2

Heat 3

Heat 4

Heat 5

Heat 6

Semifinals

The fastest three in each semi-final advanced.

Semifinal 1

Semifinal 2

Final

Saturday 11 August 1928:

References

External links
Olympic Report
 

Swimming at the 1928 Summer Olympics
1928 in women's swimming
Swim